Bijin  is a station on Line 3 of Chongqing Rail Transit in Chongqing Municipality, China, which opened in 2011. It is located in Yubei District.

Station structure
There are 2 island platforms at this station. The 2 outer tracks are used for the main line of Line 3, while the 2 inner tracks are used for Konggang branch.
Nevertheless, due to the fact that trains of Konggang Branch switch beam (monorail tracks) from left to right just before leaving the station for the opposite direction (towards Jurenba), only one side of the inner tracks is used and the other side is reserved for through operation from the main line. But there are also few main line trains returning to Huanchengbeilu depot (connected with Guanyuelu station) via the reserved track at night.

References

Yubei District
Railway stations in China opened in 2011
Chongqing Rail Transit stations